Castle Bar Park railway station is in the London Borough of Ealing in west London, England and is in Travelcard Zone 4.

The station and all trains serving it are operated by Great Western Railway. When opened in 1904, it was called Castle Bar Park Halt.

The ticket office opens only morning peak hours from Monday to Friday; ticket machines were removed in 2005 due to persistent vandalism. New aluminium and perspex passenger shelters and a replacement "help point" machine were added in 2006. There is also a footbridge linking the platforms so step free access is limited to the Greenford bound platform only.

As of October 2008, Oyster "pay as you go" can be used for journeys originating or ending at Castle Bar Park.

Service
All services at Castle Bar Park are operated by Great Western Railway using  DMUs.

There is no Sunday service at the station.

Connections
London Buses route E11 serves the station.

References

External links

Railway stations in the London Borough of Ealing
DfT Category E stations
Former Great Western Railway stations
Railway stations in Great Britain opened in 1904
Railway stations served by Great Western Railway
1906 establishments in England